The Musei di San Domenico are a set of museums in Forlì in Italy.  It is located in the renovated 13th century Dominican convent.  Inside the complex is the headquarters of the civic museums of Forlì and the convent refectory, with frescoes showing a dinner (with Saint Dominic in the centre), severely damaged by soldiers during the Napoleonic period.   The complex is formed of five buildings: Palazzo Pasquali, Chiesa di San Giacomo Apostolo, Convento dei Domenicani, Convento degli Agostiniani and Sala Santa Caterina.

The Museo San Domenico keeps Germano Sartelli's archival collection.

References

Art museums and galleries in Emilia-Romagna
Museums in Emilia-Romagna
Buildings and structures in Forlì